Onchidium typhae is a species of air-breathing sea slug, a shell-less brackish water pulmonate gastropod mollusk in the family Onchidiidae.

Distribution 
Onchidium typhae is found from From north-eastern India (West Bengal) to the Philippines, including Peninsular Malaysia, Singapore, Thailand, Vietnam, eastern Borneo, and China.

Ecology 
Onchidium typhae was formerly considered to live in fresh water; however, the Chao Phraya River that the species was collected from is under tidal influence year round, and the species is now recognized to be a brackish water species.

References

Onchidiidae
Gastropods described in 1800